Saint-Arsène Church is a church in the borough of Rosemont–La Petite-Patrie in  Montreal. Its address is 1015 Bélanger Street, at the corner of Christophe Colomb Avenue.

Constructed in 1954 based on a design by architect Joseph-Armand Dutrisac, it distinguished itself with its ogival shaped belltower.

References

External links
Nos paroisses - Accueil - Église catholique Saint-Arsène 

Arsène
Arsène (Montreal)
Arsène (Montreal)
Rosemont–La Petite-Patrie
1954 establishments in Quebec